Lipoptena depressa, or the Western American deer ked, is a fly from the family Hippoboscidae and 1 of 3 flies within the genus Lipotena. They are blood-feeding parasites of the mule deer - Odocoileus hemionus in the western United States and Canada particularly in regions containing the Rocky Mountains.

Life Cycle 

The female fly will produce a single larva at a time, retaining the larva internally until it is ready to pupate. The larva feeds on the secretions of a milk gland in the uterus of the female. After three larval instars, a white pre-pupa which immediately forms a hard dark puparium. The pupa is usually deposited where the deer slept overnight. When the pupa has completed its pupation. a winged adult emerges and flies in search of a suitable host, upon which fly sheds its wings and is permanently associated with the same host. This is typical of most members of the family Hippoboscidae. Also see Lipoptena cervi for additional information on the life cycle.

Distribution/Identification 
Lipoptena depressa is found in the Western part of the United States by the Rocky Mountains ranging from Washington, Oregon, California, Idaho, Montana, South Dakota, Colorado, and Utah as well as Alberta, Canada. Their location depicts them apart from their relatives Lipoptena cervi located in northeastern United States and Lipoptena mazamae located in southeastern United States. Lipoptena depressa is occasionally misidentified as Ixodes scapularis (deer tick); however, Lipoptena depressa is considered an insect with chitinous exoskeleton; which ticks also have this type of exoskeleton, a three-part body, and three pairs of jointed legs compared to their arachnid relative.

Effects 
Lipoptena depressa does not distribute any known disease. However, infected white-tailed deer may suffer calcaneus hemorrhages which can lead to diseases and even death to the deer.
Lipoptena depressa does not feed on humans.

References 

Parasitic flies
Parasitic arthropods of mammals
Hippoboscidae
Insects described in 1823
Diptera of North America